The  California State Legislature is a bicameral state legislature consisting of a lower house, the California State Assembly, with 80 members; and an upper house, the California State Senate, with 40 members. Both houses of the Legislature convene at the California State Capitol in Sacramento. The California state legislature is one of just ten full-time state legislatures in the United States. The houses are distinguished by the colors of the carpet and trim of each house.  The Senate is distinguished by red and the Assembly by the color green, inspired by the House of Lords and House of Commons respectively.

The Democratic Party currently holds veto-proof supermajorities in both houses of the California State Legislature. The Assembly consists of 62 Democrats and 18 Republicans, while the Senate is composed of 32 Democrats and 8 Republicans. Except for a brief period from 1995 to 1996, the Assembly has been in Democratic hands since the 1970 election. The Senate has been under Democratic control since 1970, except for a brief period from 1973 to 1975.

Legislative session schedule
New legislators convene each new two-year session, to organize, in the Assembly and Senate chambers, respectively, at noon on the first Monday in December following the election.

After the organizational meeting, both houses are in recess until the first Monday in January, except when the first Monday is January 1 or January 1 is a Sunday, in which case they meet the following Wednesday. Aside from the recess, the legislature is in session year-round.

State House
Since California was given official statehood by the U.S. on September 9, 1850, as part of the Compromise of 1850,  the state capital was variously San Jose (1850–1851), Vallejo (1852–1853) and Benicia (1853–1854), until Sacramento was finally selected in 1854.

The first Californian State House was originally a hotel in San Jose owned by businessman Pierre "Don Pedro" Sainsevain and his associates.

The State Legislature currently meets in the California State Capitol in Sacramento.

Terms and Term Limits 
Members of the Assembly are elected from 80 districts and serve two-year terms. All 80 Assembly seats are subject to election every two years. Members of the Senate are elected from 40 districts and serve four-year terms. Every two years, one half of the Senate (20 seats) is subject to election, with odd-numbered districts up for election during presidential elections, and even-numbered districts up for election during midterm elections.

Term limits were initially established in 1990 following the passage of Proposition 140. In June 2012, voters approved Proposition 28, which limits legislators to a maximum of 12 years, without regard to whether they serve those years in the State Assembly or the State Senate. Legislators first elected on or before June 5, 2012, are restricted by the previous term limits, approved in 1990, which limited legislators to three terms in the State Assembly and two terms in the State Senate.

Record Keeping 
The proceedings of the California State Legislature are briefly summarized in regularly published journals, which show votes and who proposed or withdrew what. Reports produced by California executive agencies, as well as the Legislature, were published in the Appendices to the Journals from 1849 to 1970. Since the 1990s, the legislature has provided a live video feed for its sessions, and has been broadcast state-wide on the California Channel and local Public-access television cable TV.  Due to the expense and the obvious political downside, California did not keep verbatim records of actual speeches made by members of the Assembly and Senate until the video feed began. As a result, reconstructing legislative intent outside of an act's preamble is extremely difficult in California for legislation passed before the 1990s.

Since 1993, the Legislature has hosted a web or FTP site in one form or another. The current website contains the text of all statutes, all bills, the text of all versions of the bills, all the committee analyses of bills, all the votes on bills in committee or on the floor, and veto messages from the governor. Before then, committees occasionally published reports for significant bills, but most bills were not important enough to justify the expense of printing and distributing a report to archives and law libraries across the state.  For bills lacking such a formal committee report, the only way to discover legislative intent is to access the state archives in Sacramento and manually review the files of relevant legislators, legislative committees, and the Governor's Office from the relevant time period, in the hope of finding a statement of intent and evidence that the statement actually reflected the views of several of the legislators who voted for the bill (as opposed to just one).

Legislative committees 
The most sought-after legislative committee appointments are to banking, agriculture, and insurance. These are sometimes called "juice" committees, because membership in these committees often aids the campaign fundraising efforts of the committee members, because powerful lobbying groups want to donate to members of these committees.

Pocket veto 
The legislature can "pocket veto" laws by avoiding consideration and thus avoiding a vote. The Appropriations "Suspense File", which was created in the mid-1980s, is a popular way to avoid a vote.

When a committee refuses to vote a bill out of committee, a discharge petition can typically be passed by the broader membership. In California, as of 2019 this was governed by Senate Rule 28 which requires 21 members and Assembly Rule 96(a) which requires 41 members; the procedure was notably used in 1998.

In 2019, a rule change in the Assembly allowed committee chairs to avoid considering bills, which effectively kills the proposal. A proposed amendment to the constitution (ACA-23) was proposed for the 2017–2018 session to require a vote.

Across the country, pocket veto powers are not uncommon in legislatures; in Colorado, the power was notably repealed in a citizen initiative constitutional amendment in 1988 driven by various reform groups.

Overview of legislative procedure 
A bill is a proposal to change, repeal, or add to existing state law. An Assembly Bill (AB) is one introduced in the Assembly; a Senate Bill (SB), in the Senate.

Bills are designated by number, in the order of introduction in each house. For example, AB 16 refers to the 16th bill introduced in the Assembly. The numbering starts afresh each session. There may be one or more "extraordinary" sessions. The bill numbering starts again for each of these. For example, the third bill introduced in the Assembly for the second extraordinary session is ABX2 3. The name of the author, the legislator who introduced the bill, becomes part of the title of the bill.

The legislative procedure, is divided into distinct stages:

 Drafting. The procedure begins when a Senator or Assembly Member decides to author a bill. A legislator sends the idea for the bill to the California Office of the Legislative Counsel, which drafts it into bill form and returns the draft to the legislator for introduction.
 Introduction or First Reading. A legislator introduces a bill for the first time by reading or having read: the bill number, name of the author, and descriptive title on the floor of the house. The bill then goes to the Office of State Publishing. The legislator can't act on a bill, except the Budget Bill, until 30 days after its introduction.
 Committee hearing. After introduction, a bill goes to the rules committee of the house, which assigns it to the policy committee appropriate to the subject matter, for its first hearing. During the committee hearing, the author presents the bill to the committee, which may hear testimony in support of or opposition to the bill. The committee then votes on whether to pass the bill out of committee, or that it be passed as amended. Bills may be amended several times. It takes a majority vote of the committee membership to pass a bill and send it to the next committee or to the floor.
 The Fiscal committee reviews the bill if it contains an appropriation or has financial implications for the state.
 A second reading on the floor of the house happens when a bill is recommended for passage. Ordinarily there is little or no debate. If a bill is amended at this stage, it may be referred back for another committee hearing.
 Floor vote. A roll call vote is taken. An ordinary bill needs a majority vote to pass . An urgency bill or a bill with tax increases requires a two-thirds vote.  The California Constitution used to require a two-thirds vote of both houses on the yearly budget and on any bill that would increase taxes, but since the passage of California Proposition 25 (2010), the two-thirds vote is required only for tax increases. Before this change, the two-thirds vote requirement was faulted for much of what had been termed "legislative gridlock", enabling a minority party to block approval of a budget before the previous one expired.
 Second house. If it receives a favorable vote in the first house, a bill repeats the same steps in the other house. If the second house passes the bill without changing it, it is sent to the governor's desk.
 Resolution of Differences (concurrence or conference). If a measure is amended in the second house and passed, it is returned to the house of origin for consideration of amendments. The house of origin may concur with the amendments and send the bill to the governor or reject the amendments and submit it to a two-house conference committee. If either house rejects the conference report, a second (and even a third) conference committee can be formed. If both houses adopt the conference report, the bill is sent to the governor.
 Governor's action. Within 30 days after receiving a bill, the governor may sign it into law, allow it to become law without his/her signature, or veto it.  
 Overrides. A vetoed bill is returned to the house of origin, where a vote may be taken to override the governor's veto; a two-thirds vote of both houses is required to override a veto. (There has been no override in the California Legislature since 1979.)
 California Law and effective date. Each bill that is passed by the Legislature and approved by the Governor is assigned a chapter number by the Secretary of State. These chaptered bills are statutes, and ordinarily become part of the California Codes. Ordinarily a law passed during a regular session takes effect January 1 of the following year. A few statutes go into effect as soon as the governor signs them; these include acts calling for elections and urgency measures necessary for the immediate preservation of the public peace, health, or safety.

Compensation 
From December 6, 2021, members of the California State Legislature receive an annual salary of $119,702. The Assembly Speaker, Senate President pro tempore, and minority floor leaders receive salaries of $137,655. Majority floor leaders and second ranking minority leaders receive salaries of $128,680. As of 2022, these salaries are the highest paid to any state legislators. Senators receive per diem of $211 and Assembly members receive per diem of $214.

Reform proposals

Expansion proposals 

The Neighborhood Legislature Reform Act

In July 23rd, 2015, then former Republican presidential primary candidate John Cox submitted a ballot measure named "The Neighborhood Legislature Reform Act" proposed that the Legislature's districts be subdivided into "neighborhood districts" of approximately 5000 people within each Assembly district and 10000 people within each Senate district. The representatives of these "neighborhood districts" within each district would then elect 40 Senate members and 80 Assembly members by majority vote. It has been argued that while this proposal would make it easier for citizens to get the attention of any individual community representative, it would also in turn make it harder for these representatives to get the attention of their state legislators. The measure failed to acquire enough signatures to qualify as a proposition for the 2016 November elections ballot.

Sessions 
California State Legislature, 2019–2020 session
California State Legislature, 2017–2018 session
California State Legislature, 2015–2016 session
California State Legislature, 2013–2014 session
California State Legislature, 2011–2012 session
California State Legislature, 2009–2010 session
California State Legislature, 2007–2008 session
California State Legislature, 2005–2006 session
California State Legislature, 2003–2004 session
California State Legislature, 2001–2002 session
California State Legislature, 1999–2000 session
California State Legislature, 1997–1998 session
California State Legislature, 1995–1996 session

See also

California Statutes
Government of California
List of California state legislatures

Districts, elections and members 
California State Assembly Districts
California State Senate Districts
Districts in California
Members of the California State Legislature

Footnotes

References

For in-depth look at California's legislative process, see also: California's Legislature (2007), by Chief Clerk E. Dotson Wilson and Brian Ebbert (ed). Sacramento: California State Assembly.

External links

Legislative homepage
California State Assembly	
California State Senate
California Channel
Official California Legislative Information
Overview of the California Legislative Process
Glossary of Legislative Terms
Legislative Analyst's Office
JoinCalifornia archive — an online archive of California election results

1849 establishments in California
 
Bicameral legislatures